Jayce and the Wheeled Warriors (French: Jayce et les Conquérants de la Lumière) is an animated TV show which was first broadcast on TF1 on September 9, 1985, on the block Salut les p'tits loups !, and eventually on September 16 in the United States in syndication. It was produced by DIC Audiovisuel (originally distributed for syndication by SFM Entertainment) and animated by the Japanese animation studios Sunrise, Shaft, Studio Giants, Studio Look and Swan Production. The show, which ran for 65 thirty-minute episodes, was created to support Mattel's Wheeled Warriors toyline. The show had an ongoing plot which was left unresolved, with no series finale.

The show featured two duelling forces. The heroes are humans called the Lightning League who drive white and silver vehicles with assorted weaponry led by a teenager named Jayce. The villains are organic plant-based creatures called the Monster Minds who travel via large green organic vines, which can grow in and across interstellar space, and sprout seeds that grow rapidly into further Monster Minds. They are led by the very first of the Monster Minds, Saw Boss.

Background
Most of the episodes were written by the French writers Jean Chalopin and Haskell Barkin. Writers at DIC also included Larry DiTillio, Barbara Hambly and J. Michael Straczynski. Straczynski wrote about a quarter of the episodes attempting, in his words, to "hijack a dopey concept and make it into something more". Haim Saban and Shuki Levy provided the music for the show. Nearly a decade later, it was rerun on USA Network's USA Cartoon Express block from July 3, 1994 to August 25, 1995.

In the United Kingdom, the series was first screened in some regions on the ITV network in a Sunday early morning slot in 1985, but with not all of the regional franchises having a Sunday morning service at that time, it was moved to Channel 4 where it was broadcast nationally for the first time in 1986. The series was subsequently frequently repeated on Sky Channel between 1989 and 1993. It later gained renewed popularity in the UK when it was repeated intermittently in a Friday and Saturday evening slot on the children's television networks Fox Kids and Jetix, between 2001 and 2009.

No backstory was given with the toys for the Lightning League and the Monster Minds doing battle, and so distinct characters were created by DIC and Straczynski to allow for a structured story.

Plot
The series follows protagonists Jayce, Flora, Herc Stormsailor, Oon, and Gillian in their search for Jayce's father Audric. Meanwhile, they are opposing the main antagonist Saw Boss and his followers, the Monster Minds. Audric was a botanist who performed experiments with biotechnology, one experiment creating Flora. In another experiment, Audric attempted to create a plant that could prevent starvation. But when he succeeded, a nearby star exploded into a supernova. The radiation from the supernova's explosion changed the plant and four others into the Monster Minds: a race of plant-like monsters who wish to conquer the universe. Audric created a root that could destroy the Monster Minds, but was forced to flee before he could complete the task, after which the Monster Minds made Audric's laboratory their headquarters. Audric kept half of the root himself and gave the other half to his servant, the Eternal Squire Oon, whom he sent to serve Jayce. Jayce and his friends are thereafter on a quest to find Audric and form the complete root.

Movie
Due to less than successful toy sales, the series' 65-episode run was not extended, and the series ended unresolved. However, according to Straczynski, a movie had also been commissioned along with the series, following in the footsteps of other toy-based animated series such as Transformers and G.I. Joe; if the series had proven successful by increasing toy sales, production would have begun. Straczynski wrote the script, but due to the failure of the toy line, preparation for the movie was shelved.

Had the movie been filmed, it would have provided a finale for the series, with Jayce and his Lightning League meeting the original Lightning League and being trained on the home world of the Guardians. Jayce would be reunited with his father Audric, but Audric would have been killed by Saw Boss as the Monster Minds began a final assault on the galaxy, and in a final battle, Jayce would unite the root and destroy Saw Boss, ending the Monster Mind threat forever.

List of characters

The Lightning League
Jayce - Protagonist; bearer of the Legendary Ring of Light and half of the Magic Root.
Audric - Jayce's father and the original master of Oon; creator of the Magic Root (of which he bears the other half), the Monster Minds, Flora, and the early Lightning League vehicles.
Gillian - A wizard, mentor to Jayce and Flora; Flora's co-creator and the creator of all five Lightning League vehicles; implied to be centuries old.
Flora - A flower created and developed into a humanoid by Gillian and Audric; she has telepathic powers with which she can sense Monster Minds and can communicate with animals & plants.
Oon - Oon is an Eternal Squire, created by Squiresmith Wixland. Oon originally served Audric, but has since been appointed to Jayce.
Herc Stormsailor - A mercenary who is the proud owner and pilot of the space barge The Pride Of The Skies II. He used to have a close relationship with Pirate Queen Morgana and it is implied he once was a member of the Pirate Guild. He was once an intergalactic commando before he quit. He was largely modeled after Han Solo.
Brock - Flora's flying fish mount, which "speaks" in chirps and whistles.
The Zoggies - A trio of robotic canines. They seem to have a liking for Oon, who is almost always being chased by them.
Jal Gorda - Anthropomorphic alien spy who acts as a recurring guest character throughout the series. He was rescued by Audric from a Monster Mind invasion of his village and has been loyal to him ever since.

The Monster Minds
Saw Boss - The leader of the Monster Minds. He was spawned from the very plant that Audric had intended to end starvation.
Gun Grinner - Sub-boss of the Monster Minds, he oversees the Gun Trooper clones.
Terror Tank - Sub-boss of the Monster Minds, he oversees the Terror Trooper clones.
K.O. Kruiser - Sub-boss of the Monster Minds, he oversees the KO Trooper clones.
Beast Walker Commander - Sub-boss of the Monster Minds, he oversees the Beast Walker clones.
Saw Trooper Commander - The only one other than Saw Boss that can take a humanoid form. Smaller in stature than Saw Boss and notable by the stripes on his chest and the absence of a cape.
Dr. Zorg – a scientist working with Saw Boss.

The Lightning League vehicles
Every Lightning League vehicle can be driven by members of the League. They can also operate on pre-programmed battle plans, without drivers, through commands issued on Jayce's communicator. When he talks to the vehicles, they respond with a single phrase, "Command Acknowledged".

The 1st Lightning League AI Ground Vehicles created by Gillian:

Armed Force - Armed Force is a vehicle with a large golden grappling arm mounted atop it. Gillian had intended it for Audric, but instead he gave it to Jayce, when Audric was unable to join the League. It seats two, unlike its toy counterpart. Armed Force's toy counterpart included a gimmick dubbed "Stack n' Attack". Any of the other smaller vehicles could detach their wheeled chassis and attach to the top of Armed Force. A promotional comic in He-Man magazine showed two vehicles stacked atop Armed Force, though this was physically impossible using the toys, as only Armed Force featured two lined up holes suitable for another vehicle's underside to attach into. This never happens in the show; instead, the phrase "stack n' attack" refers to the Lightning League vehicles being able to exchange weapons mid-battle. The pilots are Jayce and Oon, although in "The Vase of Xiang", Flora and Brock drive it as they  attempt to rescue Jayce.
Drill Sergeant - Drill Sergeant is a two-seater vehicle with a drill to dig tunnels. It is also equipped with two pop-out guns in the front of the cab. It is driven in the opening sequence by Flora.
Quickdraw - Quickdraw is a vehicle with a concealed gun in a shield atop the vehicle, and an extended arm at the front with a spiked wheel for digging. It seats one, Gillian drives it in the opening sequence, but it has no regular driver in the series.
Spike Trike - Spike Trike is a three-wheeled vehicle built for speed. Similar to a half-tracked dune buggy, it has a pair of crunching spiked wheels at the front that lift on a single arm. Herc drives it in the opening sequence, and it is his vehicle of choice during the series as well.
Trailblazer - Trailblazer is a large, robotic, four-legged vehicle with a front-mounted battering ram, capable of carrying the smaller vehicles. It usually seats one, but is occasionally seen with unused seating for four. Trailblazer is stronger and more durable than the other vehicles, but was used much less often for reasons never disclosed (unlike the expenditure of resources that served as an excuse for the more rarely used larger vehicle troopers of the Monster Minds). Trailblazer is depicted as much larger in scale with the other vehicles than the toy counterparts. While the toy version of Trailblazer could carry a single smaller vehicle on its back, the cartoon counterpart could carry four of the smaller vehicles within its body, via a platform that lowered from its underside, every member of the Lightning League can pilot the Trailblazer.
Battle Base - Battle Base is a mobile fortress that houses all the other vehicles, and it is usually attached to the Pride as its bridge. The main weapon is a large elevating gun turret. Battle Base, like Trailblazer, is of a much larger relative scale in the animation than in its toy form. The toy for Battle Base had three garages that could each hold a single smaller vehicle, and its control bridge seated two. In the series, not only could Battle Base contain all of the smaller vehicles, but even Trailblazer was seen to be able to enter it. The bridge was a rather large full room; just like Trailblazer, every member of the Lightning League can also pilot the Battle Base as well too.

The 2nd Lightning League AI Ground Vehicles created by Gillian:

Flingshot - Flingshot is a vehicle equipped with a catapult, built in "The Stallions of Sandeen". A toy was designed, but never produced.
Spray Gunner - Spray Gunner is a vehicle with a cannon that sprays various fluids, that was added later in the series, but has no introductory episode. The toy did not reach the production stage.
The Motor Module - Motor Module is a low-riding vehicle with a powerful drive system, often used to field repair other vehicles, or to haul loads in an attachable trailer. It was added later in the series, but has no introductory episode. The toy did not reach the production stage, but was designed to be motorized, and could "Stack n' Attack" as Armed Force could (the toy version of the gimmick remained unused in the cartoon).

The Lightning League AI Air And Space Vehicles:

The Pride Of The Skies II - Also known as "The Pride" for short, it is the space barge owned by Herc Stormsailor and home to the Lightning League throughout the series.
The Space Scooter - A small air-bike.
The Emergency Cruiser - The Pride's seldom used shuttle craft.

The Monster Minds vehicles
Generally, Monster Mind battles are carried out by clones of the main Monster Minds that are grown from vines. Saw Boss is able to communicate with these clones telepathically. These clones are referred to as "troopers"; Saw Trooper, Terror Trooper, K.O. Trooper, etc. The true Monster Minds change from their humanoid forms into vehicles upon leaving their headquarters, although they are significantly larger and more powerful than their mass-produced clones.

The 1st Monster Minds' Ground Legions:

Saw Troopers - A vehicle with a large buzzsaw on a rotating stalk.
Gun Troopers - A vehicle with a cluster of cannons clenched in its teeth. The main weapon is a multi-headed spiked flail mounted on top of the body.
Terror Troopers - A tank-like vehicle with a large, Venus flytrap-like mouth mounted on the body.
K.O. Troopers - A truck-like vehicle with a large wrecking ball-like stalk. The front grill and headlights look like an angry face.
Beast Walkers - A large, four-legged vehicle with a front-mounted claw weapon that is the powerhouse of a Monster Mind clone army. They were seldom used, due to the greater energy required to spawn. Like Trailblazer, they greatly resemble the AT-AT's from Star Wars.

The second Monster Minds' Ground Legions:

Flapjacks - A van-like vehicle with a catapult; they were designed, but not produced in the toy line.
Lurchers - A vehicle with a front ram; again, not produced in the toy line.
Snapdragons - A smaller four-legged walking vehicle with front-mounted "petals" that opened like a flower to expose a laser cannon.
Battle Stations - The Monster Minds' answer to Battle Base, it was not produced in the toy line. It was used in only one episode as it took enormous amounts of energy to spawn.

The Monster Minds' Air and Space Legions:

Cruisers - A larger Monster Mind spacecraft.
Scouts/Satellites - A smaller Monster Mind spacecraft.
Drill Vines - A small rocket craft with a drill nose cone, containing a Monster Mind vine cluster, which was used to penetrate targets and release a growth of vines.
 Pods - A plant-like insertion craft launched by Cruisers or Scouts, when Drill Vines were not called for.
 Space Fighters - A small Monster Mind starfighter, used much less commonly than Scouts.

The Monster Minds' Network of Legions:

Expansion Vines - A large vine growth used to infest a planet and spawn Monster Mind Troopers, also sometimes used to connect planets through open space.
Spore Vines - Not as large as Expansion Vines, used to deploy biological weapons in the form of gases.
Receptacles - A block-like plant that is used to form a teleportation point for Saw Boss's headquarters (originally Audric's lab).
Brains - A small plant mass with a single central eye, used for communication by Monster Mind agents of other races.

Episode list

Voice actors
 Darrin Baker as Jayce
 Charles Joliffe as Gillian
 Gilles Tamiz as Oon (uncredited)
 Luba Goy as Oon (alternate; uncredited)
 John Stocker as Gun Grinner (uncredited)
 Dan Hennessey as Audric, K.O. Kruiser, and Saw Trooper
 Valerie Politis as Flora
 Giulio Kukurugya as Saw Boss
 Len Carlson as Herc Stormsailor and Terror Tank
 Peter Lewis as The opening announcer (uncredited)
 Ernie Anderson as The main opening announcer (uncredited)
 Victor Lanoux as The closing announcer (uncredited)

Mattel Wheeled Warriors toys
Originally conceived as a line of toy vehicles with "stack & attack" as a selling point, the tagline was: "Monster Minds gone mad! Lightning League to the rescue!".

The vehicles could be mixed and matched across most of the product line to allow children to create their own combinations. Accessory packs were released with extra wheels and weapons to allow for even more options. A mini comic was included with the toys, but no overarching story line was established beyond premise of the Monster Minds versus the Lightning League. Characters included with the toys where blank human drivers as pilots of the Lightning League vehicles and green brains for the Monster Minds.

Mattel ordered an animated series to promote the product, but development on this did not start until after the toys had already been produced and sales of the toys had been disappointing. When the animated series premiered, it had a vastly different story line and, aside from the vehicles and their names, nothing linked the toys to the animated series so the show did little to boost sales.

Due to the success of the animated series, Mattel developed new drivers for a second series of vehicles that more resembled their animated counterparts, as well as new vehicles, but the toys never made it to the shelves.

Home video releases
In France, the entire series was released on two VHS box sets and later released as two DVD boxed sets by Manga Distribution. In 2014, the entire series was re-released as two DVD box sets by IDP Home Video. In America, several compilations were released on VHS in the 1980s by Magic Window, a sub-division of RCA-Columbia Pictures Home Video.

On October 7, 2003, Sterling Entertainment released a single disc release on DVD in Region 1 entitled Escape from the Garden of Evil, which contains four episodes from the series. The DVD was re-issued by NCircle Entertainment in 2007.

Shout! Factory acquired the rights to the series in 2007 and subsequently released Jayce and the Wheeled WarriorsVolume 1, a four-disc set containing the first 33 episodes of the series, on March 25, 2008.

In 2011, Mill Creek Entertainment acquired the rights to the series. They subsequently released Jayce and the Wheeled WarriorsVolume 1, containing the first 32 episodes of the series, and a 10 episode "best of" collection on DVD in Region 1 on February 21, 2012. Volume 2, featuring the final 33 episodes of the series, was released on February 19, 2013. Mill Creek later released Jayce and the Wheeled Warriors - The Complete Series on DVD in Region 1 in March 2018.

Comic
An uncredited, unfinished comic based on the series was published in the French comic magazine Pif Gadget #922. The 13-page adventure ended on a cliffhanger as the next issue did not include the follow-up story and the conclusion to that story was never published in Pif Gadget. It included characters created specifically for the comic, such as a white-haired young sorceress called Algora who was an ally of Saw Boss. The story, entitled "Le Sortilège d'Algora" ("Algora's Spell") was later re-printed and completed in Poche Junior, a free supplement for younger readers in the French television listing magazine Télé Poche, in several installments: Poche Junior #1 (May 1987), Poche Junior #2 (May 1987), Poche Junior #17 (August 1987), Poche Junior #23 (October 1987), and Poche Junior #25 (October 1987).

References

External links
 
 

1980s toys
1980s Canadian animated television series
1980s Canadian science fiction television series
1985 Canadian television series debuts
1986 Canadian television series endings
1980s French animated television series
1985 French television series debuts
1986 French television series endings
Canadian children's animated action television series
Canadian children's animated adventure television series
Canadian children's animated science fantasy television series
English-language television shows
Fictional plants
First-run syndicated television programs in the United States
French children's animated action television series
French children's animated adventure television series
French children's animated science fantasy television series
Television series about genetic engineering
Television series by CBS Studios
Television series by DIC Entertainment
Television shows based on Mattel toys